Lowdown may refer to:

Songs 
 "Lowdown" (Chicago song), 1971
 "Lowdown" (Boz Scaggs song), 1976
 "Lowdown" (Xample song), 2007
 "Lowdown", a song by Tom Waits from the album Orphans: Brawlers, Bawlers & Bastards

Other uses 
 Lo Down, a former WWE tag team of D'lo Brown and Chaz
 Low Down, a 2014 American biopic film about jazz singer Joe Albany
 The Lowdown, a website about depression developed by the New Zealand Ministry of Health
 Lowdown (TV series), an Australian comedy series
 The Lowdown (TV series), a British documentary series first broadcast in 1988